The 1926 Liège–Bastogne–Liège was the 16th edition of the Liège–Bastogne–Liège cycle race and was held on 2 May 1926. The race started and finished in Liège. The race was won by Dieudonné Smets.

General classification

References

1926
1926 in Belgian sport